Mortimer Forest is a forest on the Shropshire/Herefordshire border in England, near the town of Ludlow.

History
Mortimer Forest was an ancient hunting forest, similar to areas including Bircher Common. According to Forestry England, it is a remnant of the ancient Saxon hunting forests of Mocktree, Deerfold and Bringewood. Remains of this 'ancient battleground' include a castle mound that was owned by powerful Marcher lords, who had considerable fortified bases at Wigmore and Ludlow. The name of the forest derives from the Mortimers, who were Marcher lords.

Natural history includes very old limestones and shales laid down by the sea some 400 million years ago.

Location
Mortimer Forest is located on the county boundary of Shropshire and Herefordshire, in the West Midlands region of England. The OS positioning is: SO480730, it is near the town of Ludlow, which is on the A49 road.

Climate
Mortimer Forest has typical forest climate, with lower-than-average light levels and a slightly cooler temperature. It is also in a hilly part of England, meaning it has a damp climate.

Geology
The limestones and shales of Mortimer Forest are around 400 million years old, making them round the Silurian/Ordivician age. Fossils are common in the Mortimer Forest, especially corals, trilobites and shells. This indicates that at one time the area of Mortimer Forest was underwater.

Tourism
Mortimer Forest is owned by Forestry England, which has done a number of things to facilitate tourists, including a website, signage,  picnic tables, car parks, and laying out walking tracks for different fitness abilities.

National Cycle Network route 44 passes through, en route between Ludlow and Leominster. Also passing through the area is the Mortimer Trail, a long-distance footpath.

References

External links
 Forestry England's page on The Mortimer Forest

Forests and woodlands of Shropshire
Forests and woodlands of Herefordshire
Ludlow